Vasconcellea pulchra is a species of plant in the family Caricaceae. It is endemic to Ecuador.  Its natural habitat is subtropical or tropical moist montane forest. It is threatened by habitat loss.

It was previously placed in genus Carica.

References

pulchra
Endemic flora of Ecuador
Near threatened plants
Taxonomy articles created by Polbot